Malamala is a tiny islet within the Mamanuca Islands of Fiji in the South Pacific. The islands are a part of the Fiji's Western Division.

Geography
The islet is also known as Daydream Island. There is a private resort (Malamala Beach Club) there. The islet is just 25 minutes from Port Denarau.

References

External links
Malamala Beach Club

Islands of Fiji
Mamanuca Islands